Tiffany Derry is an American celebrity chef and restaurateur. She is a Top Chef television series alum, and known for her appearances on Cutthroat Kitchen and Hungry Investors (Spike tv). She is based in Texas.

Early life
Derry was born on December 26, 1982, in Beaumont, Texas. She is African American.

Derry graduated from The Art Institute of Houston in 2003 with an Associate of Applied Science degree in culinary arts. She started her culinary career at the local International House of Pancakes at the age of 15, where she later had a management position.

Restaurant career 
Derry was the chef and owner of "Private|Social" in Dallas from 2011 to 2013. In 2012, Derry founded her professional website promoting her culinary career and her restaurant, "Private|Social." In 2013, Derry expressed interest in opening her own restaurant in her hometown of Beaumont.

Derry has also working with the Dallas Independent School District to improve their school lunch program in order to provide healthier options.

Derry opened Roots Chicken Shak in Plano in 2017.

Derry, partnering with investor Tom Foley of T2D Concepts and Indigo Group, to opened Roots Southern Table in June 2021 in Farmers Branch, Texas as an expansion concept to Roots Chicken Shak. The concept is chef driven and the menu consists of high end twists to the classic southern recipes Derry grew up with. Roots Southern Table was included in the "2021 Restaurants List" by The New York Times, as one of the fifty best American restaurants of the year.

Television appearances 
Derry competed in Top Chef season 7 in Washington, D.C. and won "fan favorite" after placing fifth. She also competed among the All-Star chefs in season 8 and finished fourth as a finalist.

Derry appeared on an episode of Spike TV's Bar Rescue in June 2013,  and has appeared in a commercial promoting her alma mater, "The Art Institute of Houston".

In November 2013, she was the day's winner on an episode of Food Network's Cutthroat Kitchen and she started to appear on the Spike TV series Hungry Investors, which debuted in 2014.

In 2022, Derry was on Guy Fieri's television series, Tournament of Champions (Food Network), season 3.

Awards
In 2013, Derry was awarded the Hall of Fame by the Association of Private Sector Colleges and Universities.

References

External links

"Eight Questions for Top Chef’s Tiffany Derry" from Seattle Met

Top Chef contestants
Living people
People from Beaumont, Texas
African-American chefs
American women chefs
American chefs
Chefs from Texas
Businesspeople from Dallas
Bar Rescue
21st-century African-American people
21st-century African-American women
1982 births